Edna & Harvey: The Breakout (known in Germany as ) is a 2008 adventure game for Windows starring a young woman and her toy rabbit. The objective of the game is to escape from a mental hospital which they find themselves in at the beginning of the game.

The game began as a university project in Germany. Although that version received an outstanding reception, the English game merely received a mixed reception with both average and low review scores, mostly due to the sloppy translation.

Gameplay
Edna & Harvey: The Breakout is an adventure game in the same vein as LucasArts' pre-1994 games created using the SCUMM engine. The game screen shows a two-dimensional cartoon world where Edna, the playable character, is incarcerated within a mental hospital. The bottom edge of the screen contains a list of actions the player can perform, which must be clicked on before the player clicks on an item within the game world in order to manipulate it. The player is able to talk to objects and people, use items and interact with things in the environment. When the player tries to combine or effect one item with another each combination produces a different response, unlike in most games of this type where an incorrect combination would result in a response of "I don't know why you'd want to do that." During play expensive in-game objects such as cars can be defaced by the player, this does not affect the game in any tangible way but represents an act of rebellion.

Plot
Edna awakes in a padded cell with her toy rabbit, Harvey, who she talks to throughout the game. She has no recollection of how she came to be in the cell and must escape. In order to do so, she navigates along the ventilation shafts and gathers friends (other inmates) as well. Such friends have mental issues like two people in one sweater, one trying to become an energy being, and another who can make keys to any lock. While there, she decides to clear her father's name, although he was killed for murdering the son of the asylum's owner, Dr. Marcel. Harvey then gives Edna the ability to relive certain events in her past, called 'Tempomorphing'. After escaping in Dr. Marcel's car, they crash in a swamp and go separate ways, the 'Keymaster' following Edna. He wanted revenge on Edna for releasing 'Someone who should never be released', himself. After escaping a Church that he locked both Edna and himself in, she finds herself at her own house where she learns that she was the one who committed the murder by pushing Dr. Marcel's son down the stairs and that her father took the blame. Dr. Marcel then arrives and asks her to come back with him so he can have her memory erased as her father asked Dr. Marcel to do. Though he succeeded several times, Harvey always brought her memories back. Edna is then given two options: Destroy Harvey and have her memory erased, or listen to Harvey and push him down the stairs as his son was. If she listens to Dr. Marcel, she cuts Harvey to pieces with scissors, is renamed and given house chores to do for the rest of her life, which she then adores doing. If she listens to Harvey, then she knocks Dr. Marcel down the staircase with a mallet from his office and is never heard from again, the only clue of her fate being the remains of Harvey found by the ocean.

Development

The game was originally developed as a university project by Jan Müller-Michaelis (known as Poki), co-founder of Daedalic Entertainment.
Jan Müller-Michaelis created his own game engine using Java to implement the game.

According to Daedalic's Carsten Fichtelmann, Valve rejected Edna & Harvey and A New Beginning three times from its Steam platform "on the grounds that their target audience did not care about the game". However, Daedalic went on to achieve success on the platform.

Reception

Edna & Harvey: The Breakout garnered a Metacritic score of 56, representing "mixed or average reviews".

References

2008 video games
Windows games
Windows-only games
Daedalic Entertainment games
Point-and-click adventure games
Video games featuring female protagonists
Video games about rabbits and hares
Video games about toys
Video games set in psychiatric hospitals
Video games developed in Germany